Somers is a census-designated place (CDP) comprising the primary village in the town of Somers, Tolland County, Connecticut. As of the 2020 United States census, the Somers CDP had a population of 1,990, out of 10,255 in the town of Somers.

History 
The Somers Historic District occupies  at the center of the village. Most of the buildings are early 19th-century residences, with Federal or Greek Revival style, although there are a selection of later 19th-century styles represented as well.  The older properties are largely clustered in three places: on Springfield Road near Main, the eastern end of Main Street, and the area just west of where the modern (constructed in 1950) town hall stands.

References 

Census-designated places in Tolland County, Connecticut
Census-designated places in Connecticut